Runkle is a surname. Notable people with the surname include:

Benjamin Piatt Runkle, (1836–1916), founder of Sigma Chi fraternity, colonel in the Union Army during the American Civil War
Bertha Runkle (1879–1958), American novelist and playwright; daughter of Lucia
John Daniel Runkle (1822–1902), US educator and mathematician
Lucia Runkle (1844–1922), American editorial writer; mother to Bertha
Nathan Runkle (born 1984), American animal rights advocate
Theadora Van Runkle (1929–2011), American costume designer

See also
Runkle, West Virginia, unincorporated community